Vamos Juan is a Spanish comedy television series starring Javier Cámara and María Pujalte. It is the sequel to Vota Juan. The plot concerns the attempts of Juan Carrasco to return to politics.

Premise 
Both Juan Carrasco (Javier Cámara) and Macarena Lombardo (María Pujalte) have returned to Logroño, where the former works as highschool biology teacher, harassed by his students and the latter as editor for a local newspaper, El Diario Logroñés. Meanwhile, Juan's personal secretary, Víctor (Adam Jezierski), has preserved his job, and remains working at the national government cabinet. Driven by spite, Juan seeks to return to politics, and re-hires Macarena as well as he enlists Eva (Esty Quesada), his own daughter, as community manager.

Cast 
 Javier Cámara as Juan Carrasco.
 María Pujalte as Macarena Lombardo, Juan's director of communications.
 Adam Jezierski as Víctor Sanz, Juan's former personal secretary.
 Pedro Ángel Roca, former Juan's driver when he served as minister.
 Joaquín Climent as Luis Vallejo.
  as Recalde.
 Yaël Belicha as Juan's wife.
 Esty Quesada as Eva, Juan's daughter and community manager of the new party.
 Anna Castillo as Montse.
 José Manuel Cervino
 Alberto San Juan

Production and release 
The series was created by Diego San José. The series was shot in Logroño in October 2019. Directed by Víctor García León, Borja Cobeaga and Javier Cámara, the series' sixth episode, "Estambul Hadi Juan", was Cámara's debut as director. The 7-episode series premiered on 29 March 2020 on TNT.

Awards and nominations 

|-
| align = "center" rowspan = "6" | 2021 || rowspan = "3" | 8th  || colspan = "2" | Best Comedy Series ||  || rowspan = "3" | 
|-
| Best Direction || Víctor García León, Borja Cobeaga and Javier Cámara || 
|-
| Best Comedy Actress || María Pujalte || 
|-
| rowspan = "2" | 8th Feroz Awards || colspan = "2" | Best Comedy Series ||  || rowspan = "2" | 
|-
| Best Lead Actor in a TV Series || Javier Cámara || 
|-
|  68th Ondas Awards || colspan = "2" | Best Comedy Series ||  || 
|}

References 

Television shows set in La Rioja (Spain)
Television shows set in Istanbul
Television shows filmed in Spain
2020 Spanish television series debuts
2020 Spanish television series endings
2020s Spanish comedy television series
2020s political television series
Political satirical television series
Spanish satirical television shows
Spanish political satire
Spanish-language television shows
TNT (Spanish TV channel) original programming